The Geodermatophilales are an order of bacteria.

References 

Actinomycetia